Nora Stanton Barney ( Blatch; September 30, 1883 – January 18, 1971) was an English-born American civil engineer, and suffragist.  Barney was among the first women to graduate with an engineering degree in United States. Given an ultimatum to either stay a wife or practice engineering she chose engineering. She was the granddaughter of Elizabeth Cady Stanton.

Early life
She was born Nora Stanton Blatch in Basingstoke, Hampshire, England, in 1883 to William Blatch and Harriot Eaton Stanton, daughter of Elizabeth Cady Stanton. She studied Latin and mathematics at the Horace Mann School in New York, beginning in 1897, returning to England in the summers. The family moved to the United States in 1902. Nora attended Cornell University, graduating in 1905 with a degree in civil engineering. She was Cornell University's first female engineering graduate. In the same year, she was the first woman admitted (accepted as a junior member) of the American Society of Civil Engineers (ASCE). She also began work for the New York City Board of Water Supply and for the American Bridge Company in 1905–06.

Following the examples set by her mother and grandmother, Nora also became active in the growing women's suffrage movement. She was the first female member of the American Society of Civil Engineers, where she was allowed to be a junior member only and denied advancement to associate member in 1916 solely because of her gender. At the time, women were only admitted as junior members. In 1916, she sued the American Society of Civil Engineers (ASCE) for refusing to admit her as a full member, even though she met all requirements.  Blatch lost, and no woman became a full ASCE member for a decade. In 2015, she was posthumously advanced to ASCE Fellow status.

Marriage to Lee de Forest 

In 1908, she married the inventor Lee de Forest, and helped to manage some of the companies he had founded to promote his invention and the new technology of wireless (radio). The couple spent their honeymoon in Europe marketing radio equipment developed by de Forest. However, the couple separated only a year later, due largely to de Forest's insistence that Nora quit her profession and become a conventional housewife. Shortly afterward, in June 1909, Nora gave birth to their daughter, Harriet. In 1909, she began working as an engineer for the Radley Steel Construction Company. She divorced de Forest in 1912. After her divorce, she continued her engineering career, working for the New York State Public Service Commission.

Later life
In 1919, Nora married Morgan Barney, a marine architect. Their daughter, Rhoda Barney Jenkins, born July 12, 1920, in New York, was an architect and social activist.  Rhoda died August 25, 2007, in Greenwich. Nora continued to work for equal rights for women and world peace, and in 1944 authored World Peace Through a People's Parliament.

Nora worked as a real-estate developer and political activist until her death in Greenwich, Connecticut on January 18, 1971. She is buried in Woodlawn Cemetery and Conservancy, Bronx NY with Memorial ID 92785151.

References

Further reading

External links

1921 passport photo

British emigrants to the United States
1883 births
1971 deaths
English suffragists
Cornell University College of Engineering alumni
People from Basingstoke
Livingston family
American women architects
American civil engineers
American women engineers
Cornell University alumni